Cryptophilus integer is a species of pleasing fungus beetle in the family Erotylidae. It is found in Australia, Europe and Northern Asia (excluding China), North America, and Oceania.

References

Further reading

External links

 

Erotylidae
Articles created by Qbugbot
Beetles described in 1841